T.M. Karthik is an Indian actor acted in stage plays and feature films. He made his acting debut in films with Guru (2007).

Career
Since 1994, Karthik has acted in over 60 productions and been on stage over 500 times to perform. Before becoming an actor, Karthik worked in the corporate world. TM Karthik is a part of the Evam group founded by Karthik Kumar. some of his films include Madrasapattinam,   Deiva Thirumagal,   Guru,   Life of Pi and he got his breakthrough as Ileana's price-tag fiancé in Nanban.

Filmography

 Web series
Vella Raja (2018) as Kamesh

References

External links
T. M. Karthik on Twitter

Indian male film actors
Male actors in Tamil cinema
Living people
Year of birth missing (living people)
Tamil comedians